Nasser Al Saeed (1923–unknown) was a Saudi Arabian writer and the founder of the Arabian Peninsula People's Union (APPU). He was one of the most significant critics of the Saudi royal family. He was kidnapped in December 1979 in Beirut, Lebanon, and there has been no information about his whereabouts since then. His case is the first reported instance of the state-sponsored abduction by Saudi Arabia.

Biography
Al Saeed was born in 1923 and hailed from a family from the Shammar tribe based in Hail. He was employed in Aramco.

Al Saeed involved in protests against the royal establishment in 1947 due to the inefficiency of Saudi Arabia and other Arab countries to end the attempts to establish an Israeli state in the Middle East. The protests became much more intense following the establishment of Israel in 1948 and the recognition of the state by the U.S. which had close ties with Saudi Arabia. His opposition continued in the 1950s through radio broadcast. Al Saeed was one of the leaders of the strike among Aramco workers in 1953. Following this incident he was put under house arrest in Hail. At the end of the same year and in the early days of 1954 Al Saeed and other strike leaders formed the National Reform Front. They were secular and leftist and had connections with both Najdi and Hijazi people. In 1956 following the riots Al Saeed left Saudi Arabia and settled in Damascus, Syria, where he established the Nasserist Union of People of the Arabian Peninsula (ittihad sha'b al-jazira al-'arabiyya) in 1959 which was renamed as the Union of the Sons of the Arabian Peninsula. In 1960 the Union became a member of the Arab National Liberation Front which also included the Free Princes Movement founded by the Saudi royals led by Prince Talal bin Abdulaziz Al Saud. Al Saeed established the APPU in 1960. In 1963 he went to Sanaa, Yemen, where he founded an office for his organization. Later he left the Arab National Liberation Front and returned to Syria.

Work
His book, Tarikh Al Sa'ud (Arabic: History of Al Saud), was published in 1965. In the book Al Saeed claimed that in 1943 the Saudi ambassador to Egypt, Abdullah bin Ibrahim Al Mufaddal, asked Muhammad Al Tamimi to create a fake family tree for the Al Saud family and the family of Muhammad Abd al Wahhab, founder of Wahhabism, and to relate them to the origins of Prophet Muhammad. It is also argued in the book that the Al Saud have Jewish roots. Ghassan Salamé remarks that Tarikh Al Sa'ud is not objective and lacks the necessary evidence to support its strong claims against the Saudi royal family.

Disappearance and aftermath
During his visit to Beirut, Lebanon for interviews with Arab and Western media, Al Saeed was abducted in the Hamra district of Beirut by Saudi agents on 17 December 1979. Just before his kidnapping Al Saeed praised those who seized Great Mosque in Mecca in November 1979. He described the seizure as a revolution that was the result of newly emerging controversies in Saudi Arabia. He added that the incident was organized by the opposition forces and carried out by military officials and tribesmen and that each revolutionary Muslim had a right to capture the Ka'ba as the prophet Mohammed did in order to satisfy his conscience.

In the kidnapping of Al Saeed Abu al Zaim, one of the Fatah movement's senior figures, helped Saudi agents. The mediator of this collaboration was the Fatah leader Yasser Arafat who was paid by the Saudi authorities for it. Al Saeed was taken to his native country by the agents, and his fate has been unknown since then. Based on the Arab media reports Ghassan Salamé states that Al Saeed was executed immediately after he was brought to Saudi Arabia. Saudi Arabia denied any role in his disappearance.

See also
List of kidnappings
List of people who disappeared

References

External links

20th-century Saudi Arabian writers
1923 births
1970s missing person cases
Human rights abuses in Lebanon
Human rights abuses in Saudi Arabia
Kidnapped people
Missing person cases in Lebanon
People from Ha'il
Political party founders
Saudi Arabian dissidents
Saudi Arabian emigrants to Yemen
Saudi Arabian prisoners and detainees
Year of death missing